Gloucester County (2016 population 78,444) is located in the northeastern corner of New Brunswick, Canada. Fishing, mining and forestry are the major industries in the county. The eastern section of the county is known for its Acadian culture.

Census subdivisions

Communities
There are nineteen municipalities within the county (listed by 2016 population):

First Nations
There is one First Nations reservation in Gloucester County (listed with 2016 population):

Parishes
The county is subdivided into ten parishes (listed by 2016 population):

Demographics

Language

Access Routes
Highways and numbered routes that run through the county, including external routes that start or finish at the county limits:

Highways

Principal Routes

Secondary Routes:

Secondary Routes (cont):

External Routes:
None

Protected areas and attractions

Notable people

See also
List of communities in New Brunswick

References

External links

Gloucester County Guide

 
Counties of New Brunswick